Krenn School, also known as St. Clara Community Building, is a historic one-room school building located at New Milton, Doddridge County, West Virginia. It was built in 1897, and is a one-story rectangular, wood-frame building measuring 35 feet deep and 24 feet wide. It has a low pitched gable roof covered in corrugated metal. The building was renovated in 1922.  It was used as a school until the late 1930s, at which time it became a community center.

It was listed on the National Register of Historic Places in 1989.

References

Defunct schools in West Virginia
Former school buildings in the United States
National Register of Historic Places in Doddridge County, West Virginia
One-room schoolhouses in West Virginia
School buildings completed in 1897
Schools in Doddridge County, West Virginia
School buildings on the National Register of Historic Places in West Virginia